Haliscera is a genus of hydrozoans in the family Halicreatidae.

Species
There are three recognized species in the genus Haliscera:

Invalid species names
 Haliscera alba Vanhöffen, 1902 [species inquirenda]

References

 

Halicreatidae
Hydrozoan genera